Zinc finger C2HC-type containing 1B is a protein that in humans is encoded by the ZC2HC1B gene.

References

Further reading